Zhana Bergendorff (born Zhana Vladimirova Brankova, on 20 October 1985) is a Bulgarian singer and songwriter. She is known for winning the second series of Bulgarian X Factor in 2013.

Biography

Early life
Zhana was born in Sofia, Bulgaria under the name Zhana Vladimirova Brankova, adopting the father and family name of her second father. She started singing at the age of 7. Her mother (a paratrooper) played the piano, and her maternal grandparents (both practicing jurists) played the violin. When she was 18 years old she moved to sing in South Korea. She lived there until 2010 and later moved to Denmark, her husband's country of origin. In Denmark she entered X Factor Denmark.

2013: X Factor Bulgaria
Zhana participated in X Factor Bulgaria 2013. In all the weeks of the show, she was never threatened by elimination. She reached the finals with Ana-Maria Yanakieva and Atanas Kolev. Ana-Maria gained 3rd place, Zhana won the public vote by 69,9% winning the 2013 X factor title.

2014–2017: Virginia Records and VIP Brother Bulgaria
On 12 June 2014, Bergendorff's debut single, titled "Samuray" was released by Virginia Records. The song was written by Rushi Vidinliev, and the music and arrangement were done by Ray Hedges and Nigel Butler. In December, a collaboration between Zhana and Kristo was released, with the name "Igraem S Teb Do Kraya". Few months later, on 9 May 2015, her second single was released, titled "Nevazmozhni Sme Sami". In 2016, Zhana took part of the VIP Brother 2016 season, where she entered second, lasted 41 days and was the fourth person eliminated from the house. Her last record with Virginia Records, called "Dokrai", was released on 7 January 2017 and she announced her departure from the company in mid–August when her contract wasn't renewed.

2018: Eurovision Song Contest

On 12 March 2018, it was announced that Bergendorff will be part of the group named Equinox, which will represent Bulgaria in the Eurovision Song Contest 2018 with their song "Bones". They finished 14th in the Grand Final.

Personal life
Zhana has one son Leon, born in 2010. She is married to Stefan Bergendorff, a Danish ship engineer she met in South Korea. She has lived in South Korea and Denmark. She speaks Bulgarian, English, Korean and Danish.

In 2016, she was arrested and charged for usage of drugs.

Discography

Tours
 The Voice of Summer Tour 2014
 Coca-Cola Happy Energy Tour 2014
 The Voice of Summer Tour 2015

External links
 X Factor profile 
 Official Facebook page

References

1985 births
Living people
Musicians from Sofia
Bulgarian pop singers
Bulgarian rock singers
21st-century Bulgarian women singers
X Factor (Bulgarian TV series)
Big Brother (Bulgarian TV series) contestants
Eurovision Song Contest entrants for Bulgaria
Eurovision Song Contest entrants of 2018